The discography of Canadian pop duo Appleton consists of one studio album, three singles and three music videos. The group is made up of sisters Nicole and Natalie Appleton, who were originally members of British R&B girl group All Saints. In 2001, All Saints announced their break up, and Nicole and Natalie began recording an album together in 2002, under the name Appleton. In September 2002, they released their debut single "Fantasy", which reached number two in the United Kingdom, and was followed by singles "Don't Worry" and "Everything Eventually". On 24 February 2003, the sisters released their debut album Everything's Eventual, which charted at number nine in the United Kingdom and was certified Silver by the British Phonographic Industry for over 60,000 copies sold.

Albums

Studio albums

Singles

As lead artist

Music videos

References 

Discographies of Canadian artists